West Fourth Street Historic District may refer to:

 West Fourth Street Historic District (Maysville, Kentucky)
 West Fourth Street Historic District (Cincinnati, Ohio)